"Manic Monday" is a song written by American musician Prince, but is better known from the version recorded by the American pop rock band the Bangles, which was the first single released from their second studio album, Different Light (1986). Prince used the pseudonym "Christopher" for the song's writing credits and originally it was intended for the group Apollonia 6 in 1984. Lyrically, it describes a woman who is waking up to go to work on Monday, wishing it was still Sunday so that she could continue relaxing.

The single, released by Columbia Records on Monday, January 27, 1986, received generally positive reviews from music critics, with comparisons being made to the Mamas & the Papas' "Monday, Monday". It became the Bangles' first hit, reaching No. 2 in the United States and the United Kingdom. It also reached No. 2 in Austria, Canada, Germany, and Ireland, and peaked within the Top 5 in Australia, New Zealand, Norway, and Switzerland. It was later certified silver in the UK by the British Phonographic Industry (BPI).

Background and composition

Prince wrote "Manic Monday" in 1984, and recorded it as a duet for the band Apollonia 6's self-titled album; however, he eventually pulled the song. Two years later, he offered the single to the Bangles under the pseudonym "Christopher", a character he played in the 1986 film Under the Cherry Moon. It was rumored by various writers that after Prince listened to the band's 1984 debut album All Over the Place, he gave the song to Bangles rhythm guitarist Susanna Hoffs, in hopes of winning her affection. An original demo with Apollonia and Prince appeared in the 2001 bootleg, "The Work - Volume 1." It would be another 18 years before an official version was posthumously released with Prince as the primary vocalist. That recording appears on the 2019 demo compilation, Originals.

In an interview with MTV UK in 1989 Debbi Peterson explained why Prince gave them the song: "[Prince] really liked our first album. He liked the song 'Hero Takes a Fall', which is a great compliment, because we liked his music. He contacted us, and said, 'I've got a couple of songs for you. I'd like to know if you're interested,' and of course we were. One of the songs Prince brought to the group was 'Manic Monday', written under the pseudonym of Christopher." Peterson talked about the evolution of what Prince brought them: "It was a Banglefication of a Prince arrangement. He had a demo, that was very specifically him. It was a good song, but we didn't record it like 'This is our first hit single! Oh my God! I can feel it in my veins!' We just did the song, and the album, and then sat back and thought about it."

A pop song written in D major, "Manic Monday" moves at a tempo of 116 beats per minute and is set in common time. The song has a sequence of D–A7–G–D–A7–G as its chord progression. Lyrically, the song is about someone waking up from a romantic dream at six o'clock on Monday morning, and facing a hectic journey to work when she would prefer to still be enjoying relaxing on Sunday—her "I-don't-have-to-run day". Actor Rudolph Valentino is referred in the first verse.

Reception

Critical response
Some critics compared the song with the single "Monday, Monday" by the band the Mamas & the Papas. In a review for AllMusic, Mark Deming said that the single "was a far cry from anything the Bangles had recorded before"; while Matthew Greenwald, also from the website, said
It's a clever and deceptively simple pop narrative, an infectious pop confection ... There is also an excellently written bridge that shows Prince/Christopher to be an excellent craftsman, and, to their credit, the Bangles carry it off with style and wit.
Robert Hilburn from Los Angeles Times called the song "a candidate for best single of the year". The Guardian music critic Dorian Lynskey commented about the painful rhyming of "Sunday" with "I-don't-have-to-run day."

Mark Moses from The Phoenix said "the lack of lyrical substance is so glaring that Prince's lame 'Manic Monday' seems like a thematic highlight". Greg Baker of The Miami News wrote in the album's review that "the song should put the Bangles on the 'pop 'n' roll' map". A writer in Toledo Blade noted that "Manic Monday" was "infectious" and, along with "If She Knew What She Wants", both were "refreshingly melodic". Chris Willman from the Los Angeles Times commented: "The first single 'Manic Monday' represents slumming songwriter Prince's attempt mostly successful save for the inevitable getting down interlude to concoct a modern day Mamas and the Papas hit."

Chart performance
"Manic Monday" debuted at number 86 on the Billboard Hot 100, on the week ending January 25, 1986, and reached a peak of number two, on the issue dated April 19, 1986, behind Prince and the Revolution's single "Kiss". In the United Kingdom, "Manic Monday" debuted at number 85 on February 8, 1986, and entered the top 40, at number 24, on February 22, 1986. The song eventually reached its peak position, at number two, the next month. In Germany, the single debuted at number 29 on March 17, 1986, reaching the top 10 in the next three weeks, and its peak, also at number two, on April 14, 1986, where it stayed two weeks. It remained in the top 10 for four more weeks, leaving the charts on July 20, 1986.

In Switzerland, "Manic Monday" debuted at number 12 on March 30, 1986, becoming the highest debut of the week. It reached its peak two weeks later at number four, where it remained another week. In the Netherlands, the single debuted at number 43 on February 22, 1986; and managed to reach number 24. It stayed on the chart for seven weeks. In Norway, "Manic Monday" debuted at number nine in the 10th week of 1986, becoming the second-highest debut of the week. It also reached the number four two weeks later, where it stayed another two. The song also peaked within the top five in the Austrian, the Irish, and the New Zealand charts.

Track listing and formats

 
7" single
A. "Manic Monday" – 3:03
B. "In a Different Light" – 2:50

12" maxi (1985)
A. "Manic Monday" – 3:03
A. "In a Different Light" – 2:50
B. "Going Down to Liverpool" – 3:19
B. "Dover Beach" – 3:42

12" maxi (1986)
A. "Manic Monday" – 3:03
B. "Manic Monday" (Extended version)  – 4:38
B. "In a Different Light" – 2:50

Digital single
 "Manic Monday" – 3:06

Starbox
 "Manic Monday" (Extended "California" Version) – 4:59

Credits and personnel
Susanna Hoffs – lead vocals, acoustic guitar
Prince as "Christopher" – writer, composer, backing vocals
Vicki Peterson – electric guitar, backing vocals
Michael Steele – bass, backing vocals
David Kahne – producer
Debbi Peterson – drums
Source:

Cover versions
In 2020, Billie Joe Armstrong, vocalist of Green Day, covered the song for his No Fun Mondays series. Susanna Hoffs plays the guitar and provides backing vocals that, according to Andrew Trendell of NME, "match Armstrong's silky sentimental side". Ryan Reed wrote for Rolling Stone that the version replaces the "twinkling synths and clean strums with palm-muted crunch".

Charts

Weekly charts

Year-end charts

Certifications

References

1986 songs
1986 singles
The Bangles songs
Songs written by Prince (musician)
Columbia Records singles
Song recordings produced by David Kahne
Drifters (Swedish band) songs
Number-one singles in South Africa